Windsor-Essex Pride Fest is an LGBT Pride festival, held annually in Windsor, Ontario, Canada. The event is organized by Windsor Essex Pride Fest, a non-profit organization, and is currently held in early August each year.

The event was first held in 1992. Most festival events take place at the downtown Riverfront Festival Plaza, with the concluding parade taking place on Ouellette Avenue between Elliott Street and Riverside Drive.

Windsor-Essex Pride Fest also organizes other LGBT community events throughout the year, as well as participating in tourism marketing projects including the publication of an LGBT tourism guide to Windsor and Essex County in 2012. The organization received a $210,000 grant from the Ontario Trillium Foundation in 2012 to expand its programming.

References

External links
Windsor Pride

Pride parades in Canada
Festivals in Windsor, Ontario
LGBT in Ontario
1992 establishments in Ontario